The Pine Valley Creek Bridge, officially named the Nello Irwin Greer Memorial Bridge, is a reinforced concrete box girder bridge in San Diego County, California near the town of Pine Valley. The bridge was built in 1974 as part of the Interstate 8 (I-8) freeway system. At the time of its construction, it was the first bridge constructed in the United States using the segmental balanced cantilever method. 

Originally known unofficially as the Pine Valley Creek Bridge, a California State Senate concurrent resolution (SCR-33) officially named the bridge in honor of the project engineer, Nello Irwin Greer, responsible for designing the section of I-8 known as the "Pine Valley Project".

In the original design, the freeway's routing followed the old U.S. Route 80 (US 80) path through the center of the town of Pine Valley. This would have destroyed much of the town and many of the native pines found there. Greer's design re-routed the freeway to the south through Pine Valley Creek Canyon, bypassing and preserving the quaint beauty of this eastern San Diego County mountain community. This new design also saved  of freeway construction, saving millions of dollars in costs.

See also
 
 
 
 List of bridges in the United States by height

References

Bridges in San Diego County, California
Bridges on the Interstate Highway System
Concrete bridges in California
Road bridges in California
Interstate 8
Bridges completed in 1974
U.S. Route 80
Box girder bridges in the United States